Prior to the creation of the AFL Women's (AFLW), the AFL ran four years of exhibition matches between sides representing  and : the winner received the Hampson–Hardeman Cup, named in honour of women's football pioneers Barb Hampson and Lisa Hardeman, who developed the first women's championships in 1992.

History

See also

AFL Women's
AFL Women's National Championships

References

External links

AFL Women's
Women's Australian rules football competitions in Australia
Melbourne Football Club
Western Bulldogs